Ichiro Mihara may refer to:
Ichiro Mihara, vice president of Arika
Ichiro "Icchan" Mihara, recurring Clamp character in Angelic Layer and Chobits